Huang Yazhou (born 1949) is a Chinese novelist, poet and screenwriter. He is now a member of Chinese Communist Party and the president of Zhejiang Writers Association.

Biography
Huang was born in 1949 in Hangzhou, Zhejiang, with his ancestral hometown in Xiaoshan District, where was He Zhizhang's hometown.

Huang primarily studied at Yinmajingxiang School. When he was a senior high school student, he wrote a play Wang Banxian and acted it out by himself.

When the Down to the Countryside Movement was launched by Mao Zedong, Huang became a soldier in Zhejiang Production and Construction Corps, and he published his Novella Intersection and a collection of poems, The Thick Grove.

In 1975, Huang was assigned to a factory in Tongxiang County as an official, his short story The Story of River Water and Well Water won 1st Zhejiang Excellent Children's Literature Award. In 1979, his drama The Investigator's Love was edited and filmed by Xi'an Film Studio.

In November 1979, Huang was transferred to Jiaxing as an editor in Southern Lake periodical office, his drama The Shipper was made into TV series, and won the 1st National Excellent TV Series Award.

In 1989, Huang's drama Chinese Creation Myth was edited and filmed by Shanghai Film Studio, and won the National Excellent TV Series Award, National Five Top Project Award, and 12thGolden Rooster Award for Best Writing.

In the end of the 1989, Huang was transferred to Zhejiang Writers Association as an official, he published his collection of poems Four Questions of The West Lake. When he returned to Hangzhou, he wrote the dramas The Old House and The New House and The Wild Girl Molihua(). The Wild Girl Molihua won the 11th China Golden Eagle TV Art Awards.

From 1991 to 1993, Huang published the dramas The Sun's Cradle, The Bodyguard Hauser and The Luohe Town's brother. The Luohe Town's brother won the 12th Frankfurt International Film Festival for Children Award and 12th Chicago International Film Festival for Children Award.

In 1990, Huang served as the president of Zhejiang Writers Association, he published the dramas Deng Xiaopong: 1928(), Zhang Zhizhong and The Story of Shanghai. The Story of Shanghai won the Flying Apsaras Award.

In 2001, Huang published his novel The Sun Comes Up in The East and won the National Five Top Project Award and National Book Award.

In 2005, Huang published his collection of poems Singing on The Long March Trail and won the 4th Lu Xun Literary Prize and National Excellent Poem Award.

In June 2008, Huang published his collection of poems How Great The People's Republic of China and the novel, Lei Feng.

In 2011, Huang wrote the novel, Beginning of The Great Revival, which was edited and filmed by director Han Sanping.

In 2013, Huang's novel Lei Feng won the National Five Top Project Award, his dramas Give You A Bear Heart won 2012 Xia Yan Film Prize, and his poems I Singing in Beijing won the Zhouzhou Shihui Award.

Works

Novellas
 Intersection

Long-gestating novels
 The Sun Comes Up in The East
 Lei Feng
 Beginning of The Great Revival

Short stories
 Childhood

Poems
 The Thick Grove
 Four Questions of The West Lake
 Singing on The Long March Trail 
 How Great The People's Republic of China 
 I Singing in Beijing

Dramas
 The Investigator's Love
 The Shipper
 Chinese Creation Myth 
 The Old House and The New House
 The Wild Girl Molihua
 The Sun's Cradle
 The Bodyguard Hauser
 The Luohe Town's brother
 Deng Xiaopong: 1928
 Zhang Zhizhong
 The Story of Shanghai
 Give You A Bear Heart

References

1949 births
Writers from Hangzhou
Living people
Chinese dramatists and playwrights
People's Republic of China poets
Chinese male short story writers
Poets from Zhejiang
Chinese male novelists
People's Republic of China short story writers
Short story writers from Zhejiang